Just Deal is a comedy-drama series that aired Saturday mornings on NBC as a part of the network's TNBC lineup. The series premiered on September 23, 2000 and ended on September 7, 2002.

Premise
The show revolves around Dylan Roberts, an ordinary teenager living in the suburbs of Seattle, whose older brother Mike is the star quarterback of the high-school football team. Dylan's best friend Jermaine Greene is a biracial, highly educated teen who wants to go to Harvard someday. They spend a lot of time together until Ashley Gordon, the new girl in town, takes up most of Dylan's attention. Together they add up to a strong group of friends.

Production
The show was the first on TNBC to use the single-camera format (i.e. not in front of a live audience and with no laugh track). Another single-camera show, Sk8, was created soon after, but the TNBC lineup, including Just Deal, was soon canceled in favor NBC leasing its Saturday morning lineup to Discovery Kids in fall 2002. The show later aired briefly on Noggin's The N programming block from 2003 to 2004.

Cast

Main cast
Brian T. Skala as Dylan Roberts
Erika Thormahlen as Ashley "Ash" Gordon
Shedrack Anderson III as Jermaine Greene
John L. Adams as Mr. Peña (Season 1)

Recurring cast
Will Sanderson as Mike Roberts Jr.
Eileen Pedde as Coleen Roberts
Eric Keenleyside as Mike Roberts Sr.
Alison Matthews as Emily Gordon
Fiona Scott as Naomi Esterbrook
Kandyse McClure as Kim
Jewel Staite as Laurel
Michael P. Northey as Benny
Parker Jay as Vijal
Antonio Cupo as Josh
David Paetkau as Hunter Kerrigan

Episodes

Season 1 (2000)

Season 2 (2001)

Season 3 (2002)

References

External links
 

2000s American comedy-drama television series
2000s American high school television series
2000s American teen drama television series
2000s Canadian comedy-drama television series
2000s Canadian high school television series
2000s Canadian teen drama television series
2000 American television series debuts
2000 Canadian television series debuts
2002 American television series endings
2002 Canadian television series endings
NBC original programming
English-language television shows
Television series about teenagers
Television shows set in Washington (state)
TNBC